Bayer Leverkusen became the second club to finish runner-up in both the Champions League and domestic league and cup competitions in the same season after Barcelona in 1986, with a potential treble unravelling in the final couple of weeks of the season, resulting in no trophies won at all, plus the defections of stars Michael Ballack and Zé Roberto to Bayern Munich. Leverkusen dominated the second half of the Champions League final against Real Madrid, but lost 2–1 due to a volley from Zinedine Zidane in the latter stages of the first interval.

Overview

Players

First-team squad
Squad at end of season

Left club during season

Transfers

In
  Hans-Jörg Butt - unattached (last at  Hamburg)
  Emanuel Pogatetz -  FC Kärnten
  Zoltán Sebescen -  Wolfsburg
  Michael Zepek -  Karlsruher SC
  Yıldıray Baştürk -  VfL Bochum

Out
  Adam Matysek -  Zagłębie Lubin
  Jörg Reeb -  Köln
  Robert Kovač -  Bayern Munich
  Andreas Neuendorf -  Hertha BSC
  Paulo Rink -  1. FC Nürnberg
  Marquinhos -  Flamengo
  Markus Daun -  Alemannia Aachen

Loan out
  Robson Ponte -  Wolfsburg

Match results

Bundesliga

DFB-Pokal

Premiere Ligapokal

Champions League

Third qualifying round

First Group Stage

Group F

Second Group Stage

Group D

Knockout round

Quarter-final

Semi-final

Final

Statistics

Top Scorers

Kits

References

Notes

Bayer 04 Leverkusen seasons
Bayer Leverkusen